Ashish or Aashish is a male given name. This name is most common in India and Nepal. It literally means blessing from the elderly or from God or Aashirwaad (blessing) in Hindi.

Notable people with name 《Aashish/Ashish》
Aashish Rana, Nepali singer and actor
Aashish Chaudhary, Indian film actor
Aashish Kapoor, Indian cricketer
Aashish Kiphayet, A New York-based journalist who focuses on Bangladesh and South Asia
Ashish Bagai, Canadian cricketer
Ashish Chauhan, Deputy Chief Executive Officer of Bombay Stock Exchange
Ashish Gulhati, Online activist and open source hacker
Ashish Jha Indian-American physician
Aashish Khan, Indian Classical Musician, Sarod Virtuoso 
Ashish Khetan, Indian journalist and politician
Ashish Kumar, Indian gymnast, Commonwealth Games(2010)silver and bronze medalist
Ashish Kumar Ballal, Indian hockey and Arjuna awardee
Ashish Nehra, Indian cricketer, a bowler of fast-medium pace
Ashish Patel, Canadian cricketer, a medium pace bowler
Ashish Sharma, Indian actor
Ashish Thakkar, Founder of Mara Group
Ashish Vidyarthi, National Award winning actor in India
Ashish Zaidi, India's first class cricketer

Indian given names